Spalding Falls is a cascade located in Garnet Canyon, Grand Teton National Park in the U.S. state of Wyoming. The falls can be reached by way of the Garnet Canyon Trail and are approximately  further by trail than Cleft Falls.

References 

Waterfalls of Wyoming
Waterfalls of Grand Teton National Park